Petros Zouroudis (born 6 March 1979 in Rodos, Greece) is a professional football striker, currently playing for Olympiakos Agiou Stefanou.

Career
Zouroudis was honored as the top goalscorer for the North group of the Gamma Ethniki with 17 goals in the 2004–05 season.  He was also awarded the player of the year award for the Greek third division by the PSAP (association of professional Greek footballers) for the 2004–05 season, as he was instrumental in Panetolikos' battle against relegation that season. His performance that year earned him a transfer to Kastoria F.C. in the summer of 2005, where he stayed for two years.  In 2007, Zouroudis transferred to PAS Giannena, but appeared in only one game.  After six months, he transferred to Panetolikos F.C., during the winter transfer season of the period 2007–08.  He spent two and a half years in Agrinio, helping Panetolikos return to Beta Ethniki.  After spending half of the 2010–11 season playing for Diagoras F.C., he signed with Levadiakos F.C. during the winter transfer window. In January 2012 he was transferred to Kalloni F.C., a Greek football club based in Kalloni, Lesbos, where he played until the end of the 2011–12 season. On 27 July 2012, it was officially announced from AEL 1964 FC that he had signed a one-year contract.

References 

1979 births
Living people
Greek footballers
Panetolikos F.C. players
Xanthi F.C. players
Atromitos F.C. players
PAS Giannina F.C. players
Thrasyvoulos F.C. players
Kastoria F.C. players
Panelefsiniakos F.C. players
Association football forwards
People from Rhodes
Sportspeople from the South Aegean